Sir John Byron (c. 1526 – 1600) was an Elizabethan English nobleman, landowner, politician, and knight. He was also known as Little Sir John with the Great Beard.

Life and family 
Byron was the son of John Byron by his second wife, Elizabeth Costerdine and lived at Clayton Hall, Manchester, and later Royton, both then in Lancashire and later still at Newstead Abbey in Nottinghamshire, which he inherited from his father.

He was High Sheriff of Lancashire in 1572 and High Sheriff of Nottinghamshire in 1596. He was knighted by Queen Elizabeth I of England in 1579.

Marriage and issue 
Byron married Alice Strelley, with whom he had three sons and six daughters. His eldest son was Anthony, who died before him in 1587, and thus he was succeeded by his son Sir John Byron (died 1623). His daughter Elizabeth married John Atherton. His granddaughter Margaret married to Sir Thomas Hutchinson of Owthorpe, Nottinghamshire.

References

 

1520s births
Year of birth uncertain
1600 deaths
16th-century English people
People from Royton
John
English knights
People from Newstead, Nottinghamshire
High Sheriffs of Lancashire
High Sheriffs of Nottinghamshire